The Evolutionary Air and space Global Laser Engagement (EAGLE) is a missile defence plan being developed by the United States Air Force.

The project is a combination of two separate missile defense efforts: the Aerospace Relay Mirror System and a new, high-altitude airship.  The project is designed as a means to destroy enemy missiles before they would have the opportunity to hit targets on American soil.  It involves using either ground-based, air-based or space-based lasers deflected off a massive airship (roughly 25 times the size of the Goodyear blimp) covered in mirrors that could destroy missiles but also satellites or spacecraft in a low Earth orbit.

The first tests of the airship were scheduled to begin in 2006. Its current status as of 2011 is unknown.

External links

 Popular Science article on the project
 Defense Tech article on the project

Missile defense
Military lasers